Ryley Kraft (born January 13, 1998) is an American soccer player who plays as a midfielder for Chattanooga Red Wolves in the USL League One.

Career
He was acquired by Orlando City B on March 8, 2017 after previously spending time with Sacramento Republic's youth team.

In 2018, Kraft was a trialist with the New England Revolution of the Major League Soccer.

Kraft joined OKC Energy FC of the USL in June 2018.

Kraft signed for Richmond Kickers of the USL League One on August 23, 2019.

After a spell playing the USL League Two with Des Moines Menace, Kraft returned to the professional leagues on August 5, 2022, joining USL League One side Chattanooga Red Wolves.

References

External links
US Soccer bio

USL League Two bio

1998 births
Living people
American soccer players
Orlando City B players
OKC Energy FC players
Association football midfielders
Soccer players from Sacramento, California
USL Championship players
United States men's youth international soccer players
Richmond Kickers players
USL League One players
People from Roseville, California
USL League Two players
Des Moines Menace players
Chattanooga Red Wolves SC players